Hanspeter Bennwitz (born 4 May 1930) in Dresden is a German musicologist.

Publications 
 Die Donaueschinger Kammermusiktage von 1921–1926. Dissertation Freiburg i.Br. 1961.
 Kleines Musiklexikon. Francke, Bern-München 1963.
 Interpretenlexikon der Instrumentalmusik. Francke, Bern/München 1964.
 Deutsches Theater-Lexikon. Biographisches und bibliographisches Handbuch von Wilhelm Kosch. Lieferung 20 und 21, Francke, Bern-München 1966 and 1971.
 with Franz Emanuel Wienert: CIEL. Ein Förderprogramm zur Elementarerziehung und seine wissenschaftlichen Voraussetzungen. Vandenhoeck, Göttingen 1973, .
 with Georg Feder, Ludwig Finscher and Wolfgang Rehm: Musikalisches Erbe und Gegenwart. Musikergesamtausgaben in der Bundesrepublik Deutschland. Bärenreiter, Kassel/Basel 1975, .
 Gründungsgeschichten. Ein fiktives Tagebuch. In Festschrift 10 Jahre Gesamtschule in Mainz. Von der Bürgerinitiative zum Förderverein. Mainz 1989.
 with Gabriele Buchmeier: Christoph Willibald Gluck: Ezio (Prager Fassung von 1750). Sämtliche Werke. III/14, Bärenreiter, Kassel 1990.
 with Gabriele Buschmeier, Georg Feder, Klaus Hofmann, Wolfgang Plath: Opera Incerta. Echtheitsfragen als Problem musikwissenschaftlicher Gesamtausgaben. Steiner, Stuttgart 1991, .
 with Gabriele Buschmeier, Albrecht Riedmüller: Komponistenbriefe des 19. Jahrhunderts. Steiner, Stuttgart 1997,

References

External links 
 Hanspeter Bennwitz on BND
 Hanspeter Bennwitz on ZVAB

1930 births
Living people
Writers from Dresden
German musicologists
Recipients of the Cross of the Order of Merit of the Federal Republic of Germany
Social Democratic Party of Germany politicians